Bor is a rural locality (a settlement) in Turukhansky District of Krasnoyarsk Krai, Russia, located on the Yenisei River just downstream of its confluence with the Podkamennaya Tunguska.

Geography
Bor stands directly opposite the village of Podkamennaya Tunguska on the other side of the Yenisei River.

Transportation
Bor is served by the Podkamennaya Tunguska Airport.

Climate
Bor has a subarctic climate (Köppen climate classification Dfc). Precipitation is moderate and is somewhat higher in summer and autumn than at other times of the year.

References

Rural localities in Turukhansky District
Road-inaccessible communities of Krasnoyarsk Krai